Apocynum × floribundum, the intermediate dogbane, is a member of the family Apocynaceae. It is widespread across Canada, the United States, and northern Mexico.

Intermediate dogbane is believed to be of hybrid origin because its characteristics are intermediate between A. cannabinum (dogbane) and A. androsaemifolium (spreading dogbane).

References

External links
 USDA Plants Profile for Apocynum × floribundum
  Wisplants.uwsp.edu: Apocynum × floribundum (hybrid Intermediate Dogbane)
 Mit.edu: photo of hybrid Intermediate Dogbane

Apocyneae
Hybrid plants
Flora of Canada
Flora of the Eastern United States
Flora of the Western United States
Flora of Northeastern Mexico
Flora of Northwestern Mexico
Flora of California
Plants described in 1893
Taxa named by Edward Lee Greene
Flora without expected TNC conservation status